Edwin Richard Hallifax  (1874–1950) was a senior official in Hong Kong in the early 20th century. There is a double "l" in the spelling of his surname. His official Chinese name is "夏理德". He was regarded as a very conservative officer. He died on 4 May 1950 in Tiverton, Devon.

Family
E. R. Hallifax was born on 17 February 1874, as the 7th son of Benjamin Wilson Hallifax and Mary Anne Cox. Both his parent was from Tiverton. They were married in Calcutta in 1960.

T. F. R. Waters, former Captain of Hong Kong Golf Club in 1959, wrote that E. R. Hallifax arranged to take his bride of two weeks out to his Police Bungalow house in Tai Po on 30 August and had organised a small house-warming party with the guests staying overnight. One of these guests was Jack Macgregor of Caldbecks. The house got so warm that it burnt down in the middle of the night when everything was lost including all the wedding presents!

Mr. E. R. Hallifax was a younger brother of Mr. F. J. Hallifax, aka Mr. Federick James Hallifax, who
was President of the Singapore Municipality and formerly President of Municipality of Penang, married Miss Roberta Cunningham, a sister of Mrs. Meiklejohn, in Hawick, Scotland, on 8 July 1913. Miss Cunningham was well known in Penang. Mr. F. J. Hallifax died at Brampton, Cumberland on 25 January 1933 at the age of 60.

Noel Dan Hallifax

Mr. E. R. Hallifax's youngest son was Noel Dan Hallifax (1919–1946). Noel Hallifax was a Fight Lieutenant in the Royal Air Force. During World War II, he became a prisoner of war in Germany. 

The Luftwaffe shot down Hallifax over Berlin on 15 May 1942.  Injured; the Red Cross passed him for medical repatriation, under Article 69 of the Geneva Convention, on the 6 June 1942. The German command contested this decision. They alleged, with no evidence, he had committed a criminal offense. They cited Article 53 of the Geneva Convention to deny him his repatriation. At this time, Noel Dan Hallifax wanted urgent treatment for his injuries in the UK. And thus became a serial escaper. 

Through his serial escaping the prison command dispatched Hallifax to Colditz Castle Oflag IV-C on the 14 November 1943. In May 1944 the Gestapo listed twenty percent of the medical cases in the castle as deutschfeindlich. Hallifax was on the list and because of this the Gestapo denied him medical repatriation, once more. This action to deny him repatriation traumatised Hallifax. The list also raised suspicion that the Gestapo would torture or execute the likes of Hallifax, Douglas Bader and many others, if Hitler or the Gestapo made a justification.
Hallifax left the castle for repatriation on 7 January 1945.

He died on 8 November 1946 at the age of 27 during an aircraft accident near Leeming Aerodrome, Yorkshire, on active service. He was a Squadron Leader then. He was buried at Harrogate Stonefall Cemetery. His Colditz comrade Vincent Parker rests nearby.

Career
 

He learnt Chinese from Sit Yanpo, father of the famous Cantonese Opera artist Sit Koksin. He was well known by the Chinese community by his good skills in written and spoken Chinese language.

Secretary for China Affairs
He was the Head of Registrar-General in Hong Kong which its title was changed to Secretary for Chinese Affairs in 1913.

In 1914, Kwong Wah Hospital was facing the problem of lack of funding. E.R. Hallifax proposed to direct the income of Tin Hau temple in Yau Ma Tei to Kwong Wah Hospital, which ease its financial situation.

In 1921, several Chinese community leaders, such as Shouson Chow and Fung Ping Shan proposed to establish a technical school for underprivileged children. E.R. Hallifax worried this would attract children from mainland China to come to Hong Kong and rejected it. In August 1922, the Chinese community leaders revised their proposal and set out the criteria for entry, which was only opened for local residents. E.R. Hallifax agreed with the new proposal and helped them locate the land to build the Aberdeen Industrial Institute, which is now called the Aberdeen Technical School.

On 7 April 1921, Dr. Sun Yat-sen was elected as the Extraordinary President of the Military Government in Guangzhou. The then Governor Sir Reginald Edward Stubbs was suspicious about Sun's co-operation with the Soviet Union and took a tough stand against the Military Government. On 4 May 1921, E. R. Hallifax, as the Secretary for Chinese Affairs, issued a notice to prohibit local Chinese in Hong Kong to celebrate the newly established Military Government in Guangzhou. On 6 May 1921, another notice noted that any fundraising activities for the Dr. Sun's government were not allowed. The Military Government reacted to these strongly and Stubbs finally caved in.

E.R. Hallifax played a role of the establishment of Tsan Yuk Hospital. It was Dr. S.W. Tso and Ng Hon-tsz advocated the establishment of the Hospital. Mrs. Hallifax was invited to deliver a speech when the Hospital was opened on 17 October 1922 and Mrs. Hallifax was the host of the ceremony.

In 1920, the Mechanics' Strike lasted for more than three weeks, and only after pressure from Secretary for Chinese Affairs, E.R. Hallifax, did the employers eventually concede to a 32.5% pay increase for the workers.

During the Seamen's strike of 1922, E. R. Hallifax, Secretary for Chinese Affairs, Lau Chu-pak and Shouson Chow all tried to broker a deal with the strike leaders, but without success.

In March 1927, the then Governor of Hong Kong, Sir Cecil Clementi, reported to London that gunmen from Canton had been sent to assassinate him, Hallifax, Shouson Chow and other loyal Chinese. Better relations with Canton eventually developed after Chiang Kai-shek's Kuomintang brutally purged the Communists in 1927.

In 1928, he was one of the members who accompanied Sir Cecil Clementi, the then Governor of Hong Kong, to visit Li Chai-Sum, the then Governor of Kwantung Province. The trip was regarded as an "Entente Cordiale" between the governments. A picture was taken for the visit.

Farewell dinner
On 14 March 1933, he and Sir Joseph Kemp received a warm tribute by the Chinese community leaders. A farewell dinner was held at the Kam Ling Restaurant, West Point, by their Chinese friends, Sir Shouson Chow paid a tribute to the work done by them in the Colony.

During the dinner, Shouson Chow said:
Mr. Hallifax was appointed a Cadet in the Hong Kong Civil Service as long ago as 1897, and quickly, identified himself with Chinese affairs, not the least of his accomplishments in this direction being a good knowledge of the Chinese language, both written and spoken, which is so necessary for the performance of this important duties. Having in his early years here served in magisterial, Police and other capacities in Hong Kong and the New Territories, he soon obtained a knowledge of the Chinese of all classes; and this undoubtedly stood him in good stead in 1912, when he was made Secretary for Chinese Affairs – the first to hold the position with that title. He has been the head of Chinese affairs in Hong Kong for a period longer than any of his predecessors. In fact, he has the unique distinction of having been the longest in any one senior post in the history of Hong Kong.

On several occasions Mr. Hallifax acted as Colonial Secretary, and in that capacity proved himself to be able, tactical and courteous. But it is as Secretary for Chinese Affairs that he is best known to the public. The Chinese Secretariat is a department, of which not much is heard, for necessarily it works without flourish, I might call it the "Silent Service of the Civil Government"; and like the famous Silent Service that defends our coast and trade routes, this Department has worked quietly and efficiently, and has accomplished a good deal towards the smooth running of the local administrative machine. The public, while looking at results, cannot realise to the full how much such results depend upon the man behind the scenes. There is no doubt that in recent years this office is one of the most difficult in the Colony, and I can say without fear of contradiction that the happy relations now subsisting between the Government and the Chinese community are largely due to the ability, understanding and unrivalled experience of Mr. Hallifax.
 
The award of the O.B.E. in 1918 and of the C.B.E. in 1923, therefore, came as a matter of course to one with so many achievements to his credit; and it was no surprise to find his name again figure in the Honours List two years afterwards, when the CMG was conferred on him by His Majesty the King.
 
Mr. Hallifax is leaving us soon and we feel that his place will be hard to fill. A man who shuns the limelight, he has nevertheless played an important role with great success. He has sought relaxation, where the general public saw him not, on the golf links at Fanling! I understand that he is quite a good golfer. I have read somewhere the maxim. "Keep you head still, and your eye on the ball"; and I can appreciate that Mr. Hallifax has retained that rule throughout his time. It can be said of him, in his official career, that he kept his head stready and his eye on his duties at all times.
 
Before concluding, I desire to express our very deep appreciation of the gracious presence of His Excellency the Governor, who has proven himself time and again to be a true friend of the Chinese.

In his replied speech, E. R. Hallifax recalled that "the days when he first came to the Colony, days during which the late Dr. Sun Yat-sen was kidnapped in London" He also recalled days spend in Canton and also his connection with the Police. He recounted some of the interesting cases during his connection with the Force. He then further told that his service in the New Territories that were his most pleasant memories. "For eight years I was in the New Territories, and I can only say that it was a lovely place – no roads, no railways, no houses of any account, no telephones. The telephone existed but it had the unhappy habit of breaking down at inconvenient times", said Mr. Hallifax. One incident in the New Territories, he recounted caused a good deal of amusement. He was a police officer, land officer, magistrate and treasury officer all at once. Once, while just about to go out for a jaunt in the country, he noticed his hat and several other articles were missing. The thief was apprehended and Mr. Hallifax had to act as complainant, charge him as a police officer, try, convict and sentence the thief as a Magistrate and collect the fine as a treasury officer!

Sir William Peel, the then Governor, also left his remarks during the dinner. He referred to Mr. Hallifax as a very old friend with whom he had travelled out nearly 35 years ago on the same ship to the Far East.

He received a warm tribute by the then Governor, Sir William Peel, on his last meeting in legislative council on 23 March 1933.

Hobby
When he was the District Officer North (Taipo), he had been spending his recreational time walking over the hills with gun and dog and he was a familiar figure amongst the local farmers of Fanling and the neighbouring villages. In December 1908, when he was out shooting near Tai Po, his gun went off accidentally. Sone of the shots entered his hand. The wounds received temporary attention.

It was said that he was the man more than any other responsible for the construction of a course at Fanling. The relationship of the District Officer with the village elders everywhere was avuncular or, indeed, almost paternal.

He was the President of the Hong Kong Golf Club in 1926 and the Captain of the Club in 1915 and 1928. When he was retired, the Club presented him with a handsome souvenir as a mark of their appreciation for the work he done for the Club especially in the matter of liaisoning with Government on the occasion of his retirement from the Colony. The then Captain of the Club  said during the occasion, "He had overcome Sir Henry May's anti-feeling, as he well remembers the days when Sir Henry used to ride his polo ponies over the greens at Happy Valley – before Sir Henry was converted to an enthusiastic golfer."

According to history writer Denis Way, he was also a keen rugby player and was the Chairman of the Hong Kong Football Club in 1913.

Link
E. R. Hallifax's photo, Hong Kong Legco 

Hong Kong Old Newspapers Search – Multimedia Information System, Hong Kong Public Libraries

Singapore Old Newspapers Search – Newspaper SG

Video showed E.R. Hallifax attended a ceremony with Hong Kong Chinese Leaders (at 2 min 44 seconds)

References

Sources
 

British people in British Hong Kong
1874 births
1950 deaths
Alumni of Balliol College, Oxford
Commanders of the Order of the British Empire
Companions of the Order of St Michael and St George
Government officials of Hong Kong